The 2016 AFC Solidarity Cup was the inaugural edition of the AFC Solidarity Cup, an international football tournament. It took place between 2–15 November 2016 in Malaysia.

The tournament was created by the Asian Football Confederation as a replacement for the AFC Challenge Cup which was played for the last time in 2014.

A total of nine teams were eligible to compete in this edition of the tournament. Six teams were eligible to compete after losing in the first round of the 2018 FIFA World Cup/2019 AFC Asian Cup qualification competition, while three teams were eligible to compete after losing in the play-off round 2 of the 2019 AFC Asian Cup qualification competition. After Pakistan and Bangladesh withdrew, only seven teams competed in the tournament.

Qualified teams
The following six teams qualified after losing in the first round of the 2018 FIFA World Cup/2019 AFC Asian Cup qualification competition:

The following three teams qualified after losing in the play-off round 2 of the 2019 AFC Asian Cup qualification competition:
Loser Play-off 2.1: 
Loser Play-off 2.2: 
Loser Play-off 2.3:

Venues
The tournament was held in Kuching at the Sarawak Stadium and Sarawak State Stadium.

Draw
The draw took place on 8 September 2016, 15:00 MYT (UTC+8), at the AFC House in Kuala Lumpur, Malaysia.

The seedings were based on the FIFA Ranking of August 2016. As the draw was held before the play-off round 2 of the 2019 AFC Asian Cup qualification competition was played, the identities of the Round 2 losers, as well as the number of teams which would enter the competition, were not known at the time of the draw.

Notes

Squads

Each national association must submit a list of 18–23 players, three of those players must be goalkeepers.

Group stage
The tournament's format would change depending upon the number of teams that agree to partake in the competition. Should nine teams enter, the two group winners advance to the final. Should only eight teams enter, the two group winners and two group runners-up advance to the semi-finals. Since at the end only seven teams entered, the top two teams of each group advanced to the semi-finals.

Tiebreakers
The teams were ranked according to points (3 points for a win, 1 point for a draw, 0 points for a loss). If tied on points, tiebreakers were applied in the following order:
Greater number of points obtained in the group matches between the teams concerned;
Goal difference resulting from the group matches between the teams concerned;
Greater number of goals scored in the group matches between the teams concerned;
If, after applying criteria 1 to 3, teams still have an equal ranking, criteria 1 to 3 are reapplied exclusively to the matches between the teams in question to determine their final rankings. If this procedure does not lead to a decision, criteria 5 to 9 apply;
Goal difference in all the group matches;
Greater number of goals scored in all the group matches;
Penalty shoot-out if only two teams are involved and they are both on the field of play;
Fewer score calculated according to the number of yellow and red cards received in the group matches (1 point for a single yellow card, 3 points for a red card as a consequence of two yellow cards, 3 points for a direct red card, 4 points for a yellow card followed by a direct red card);
Drawing of lots.

All times were local, MYT (UTC+8).

Group A

Group B

Knockout stage
In the knockout stage, extra time and penalty shoot-out were used to decide the winner if necessary.

Bracket

Semi-finals

Third place match

Final

Due to the withdrawal of Guam and the suspension of Kuwait, the AFC decided to invite both Nepal and Macau, the top two teams of the 2016 AFC Solidarity Cup, to re-enter 2019 AFC Asian Cup qualification as replacements in order to maintain 24 teams in the third round of the competition.

Winners

Awards
The following awards were given at the conclusion of the tournament:

Goalscorers
4 goals

 Shah Razen Said
 Xaisongkham Champathong
 Niki Torrão

2 goals

 Azwan Ali Rahman
 Khamphanh Sonthanalay
 Sitthideth Khanthavong
 Leong Ka Hang
 Nyam-Osor Naranbold
 Bimal Gharti Magar

1 goal

 Adi Said
 Keoviengphet Liththideth
 Khouanta Sivongthong
 Moukda Souksavath
 Choi Weng Hou
 Lao Pak Kin
 Mönkh-Erdengiin Tögöldör
 Ananta Tamang
 Bharat Khawas
 Nawayug Shrestha
 Sujal Shrestha
 Asikur Rahuman
 Kavindu Ishan

Final standings

|-
| colspan="11"| Eliminated in the group stage
|-

|}

References

External links
, the-AFC.com
AFC Solidarity Cup 2016, stats.the-AFC.com

 
2016
2016 in Asian football
2016 in Malaysian football
2016 Afc Solidarity Cup
November 2016 sports events in Asia
Kuching